La Trinidad is a district of the Moravia canton, in the San José province of Costa Rica.

History 
La Trinidad was created on 24 March 1950 by Decreto Ejecutivo 32.

Geography 
La Trinidad has an area of  km² and an elevation of  metres.

Demographics 

For the 2011 census, La Trinidad had a population of  inhabitants.

Transportation

Road transportation 
The district is covered by the following road routes:
 National Route 220

References 

Districts of San José Province
Populated places in San José Province